Austropyrgus smithii is a species of minute freshwater snail with an operculum, an aquatic gastropod mollusc or micromollusc in the Hydrobiidae family. This species is endemic to western Tasmania, Australia, and is found in a number of small rivers and streams.

See also 
 List of non-marine molluscs of Australia

References

Further reading

External links

Hydrobiidae
Austropyrgus
Gastropods of Australia
Endemic fauna of Australia
Gastropods described in 1889